Simon Benefeld (fl. 1381–1397) of Shoreham-by-Sea, Sussex, was an English politician.

Career
He was a Member (MP) of the Parliament of England for New Shoreham in 1381, February 1383, October 1383, April 1384, November 1384, February 1388, January 1390, 1395 and January 1397.

References

Year of birth missing
Year of death missing
English MPs 1381
English MPs February 1383
English MPs October 1383
English MPs April 1384
English MPs November 1384
English MPs February 1388
English MPs January 1390
English MPs 1395
English MPs January 1397
14th-century English politicians
People from Shoreham-by-Sea